Erceg is a Croatian and Serbian surname. Notable people with the surname include:

Abby Erceg (born 1989), New Zealand women's international football player
Filip Erceg (born 1979), Croatian writer and political activist
Michael Erceg 1956-2005, New Zealand businessman
Percy Erceg (1928–2019), New Zealand rugby union player and coach
Stipe Erceg (born 1974), Croatian-German actor
Tina Erceg (born 1988), Croatian gymnast
Tomislav Erceg (born 1971), Croatian football player

See also
 Herceg (surname)

Croatian surnames
Serbian surnames